Ein Prat: The Academy for Leadership is a pre-military leadership academy for Israeli high school graduates in Kfar Adumim in the West Bank

Ein Prat was established in 2001 by Erez Eshel and members of the Kfar Adumim community. The academy runs three first-year mechinot in Kfar Adumim (2001), Nofei Prat (2016), and Kibbutz Sufa  (2017), and one second year program (2003) in Kfar Adumim. In addition, Ein Prat opened the "Derech Prat" youth program for high school students in 2016.

History  
Ein Prat has over 800 graduates since 2001, and in 2017 has more than 350 students in multiple programs.

Founded as one organization in 2001, Ein Prat grew into two separate organizations: one based in Kfar Adumim for pre-military students and one based in Alon for post-military students. In 2016, the organizations formalized the split and the two organizations are now run by separate administrations. 

On February 1, 2018, the Israeli Ministry of Defense recognized the mechina at Kibbutz Sufa, renaming it the "Hadar" Leadership Academy after slain Israeli soldier Hadar Goldin.

Programs 
 Kfar Adumim: a ten month pre-military leadership academy in the Judean desert.
 Nofei Prat: a ten month pre-military leadership academy in the Judean desert.
 Higher Academy: a second year program on the Kfar Adumim campus for graduates of a first year pre-military academy or year of shlichut.
 Kibbutz Sufa: a seven month pre-military leadership academy in the Negev desert.
 Derech Prat: a three year leadership program for sixteen to eighteen year old students.

Curriculum 
Ein Prat’s curriculum is founded on five core elements: (1) text study.(2) physical strength, (3) the land (4) volunteer work, and (5)  group life. Throughout the different programs, students explore the connection between liberal, humanist, and Jewish values in classic texts. They participate in hikes.. They train for the Jerusalem marathon and study judo. Students volunteer at local schools and organizations, and live and work in independent groups within the academy

Staff 
 Founder, Erez Eshel
 CEO, Nimrod Palmach
 Head of the Academy, David Nachman

Board of directors 
 Herzl Makov (former Chair)
 Moshe Taubin (current Chair)
 Ilan Greenfield
 Yael Erlichman
 Boaz Ido
 Moris Zarfati
 Erez Eshel

Organizations founded from Ein Prat 
 Lev Echad
 Hashomer Hachadash
 Mechinat Tavor
 Mechinat Arava

References

External links
 

Jewish educational institutions
Mechina
Educational institutions established in 2001
2001 establishments in Israel